Yeonsu District (Yeonsu-gu) is a district in southern Incheon, South Korea.  To the east is Namdong District (Namdong-gu), on its north border is Nam District (Nam-gu), and the Yellow Sea is on the west and south sides. Munhak Mountain (Munhak-san) rises in the north, and Seunggi Stream (Seunggi-cheon) flows south to the Yellow Sea.

History
 March 1, 1995: Yeonsu-gu annexes part of Nam-gu; sub-division of Yeonsu-1-dong into Yeonsu-1-dong and Yeonsu-3-dong, and Dongchun-dong into Dongchun-1-dong and Dongchun-2-dong.
 January 1, 1996: Sub-division of Dongchun-2-dong into Dongchun-2-dong and Cheonyang-dong.
 March 1, 2003: Sub-division of Okyeon-dong into Okyeon-1-dong and Okyeon-2-dong.
 December 19, 2003: Cheongnyang-dong absorbed into Donchun-3-dong.
 March 6, 2006: Establishment of Songdo-dong administrative division, placed under jurisdiction of Dongchun-2-dong.
 January 1, 2007: Sub-division of Donchun-2-dong into Dongchun-2-dong and Songdo-dong.
 January 1, 2012: Sub-division of Songdo-dong into Songdo-1-dong and Songdo-2-dong.

Administrative Divisions of Yeonsu-gu

The Yeonsu District of Incheon is made up of 6 legal divisions and 12 administrative divisions.  The area of Yeonsu District is 42.74 km2.

Population 
As of 2010 the population of the 0-14 age group is 25%; of those 65 and over, 6.7%.  The working class population of the 15-64 age group is 68.21%, less than the national average of 72.8%.  There are somewhat more males with 100.6 males to 100 females.

Politics 
Presently, Yeunsu District has one election district.  However, the population surpassed 307,000 in July 2014, and as it continues to increase, it may increase to 2 districts for the 2016 general election.

Education 
 Chadwick International School Songdo
 Incheon Catholic University
 Yeonsu Girls' High School
 Incheon National University

References

External links

 Official Homepage 
 Official Homepage

 
Districts of Incheon